The San Bernardino de Sena Estancia (also known as the San Bernardino Rancho or Asistencia) was a ranch outpost of Mission San Gabriel Arcángel in what is now in Redlands, California, United States. It was built to graze cattle, and for Indian reductions of the Serrano people and Cahuilla people into Mission Indians. Over time, it fell into disrepair, until the early 20th century, when a new, larger structure was built as a museum. The new structure shares the same architectural style, but is not otherwise similar to the original buildings.

19th century

The estancia was established in 1819. The Politana site of the San Bernardino de Sena Estancia is a California Historical Landmark. The California missions' lands were secularized in 1833–34. In 1842 Governor Juan B. Alvarado of Alta California issued a Mexican land grant for Rancho San Bernardino to José del Carmen Lugo, José Maria Lugo, Vincente Lugo, and their cousin Jose Diego Sepulveda. Included were all of the original asistencia buildings: the chapel, a tile kiln, a lime kiln, and a grist mill. In 1851 the property was subsequently sold to Charles C. Rich and Amasa Lyman, leaders of the San Bernardino settlement of the Church of Jesus Christ of Latter-day Saints, and occupied by Bishop Nathan C. Tenney from 1851 through 1859, when Dr. Ben Barton purchased it from the Mormons due to their return to Utah. Barton practiced medicine and resided on the property until 1867. Over time, materials were removed from the abandoned adobe structure, which fell into a state of ruin.

20th century
In 1925, the County of San Bernardino acquired the property from the Barton family. All remaining historic materials were salvaged, and construction of a new, six-room structure commenced in 1926 with later funding from the Works Progress Administration relief project (assisted by the San Bernardino County Historical Society).

Since funds weren't available to restore "mere" ranchos, a great deal of artistic license was taken in the design of the new, six-room structure (including exhibit space and a residence for the site manager), which replaced what was left of the original chapel building. Additionally, a freestanding campanario (bell wall) was constructed (similar to that at Mission San Antonio de Pala) even though none had existed previously. The restoration was completed in 1937, and the rebuilt structures were unveiled to the general public as "The Asistencia." The site was operated as a museum until 2018.

Present day
Today the facility is known as the Asistencia, and is operated by the Redlands Conservancy. It was a branch of the San Bernardino County Museum until it was transferred to the nonprofit Redlands Conservancy in November, 2018. It is located at 26930 Barton Road, in Redlands.  The reconstructed asistencia and rancho buildings are open for drop-in visitors Mondays and Wednesdays 10:00 a.m to 12:00 p.m. There is no staff at the facility full-time and the site is no longer operated as a museum. Other tour times may be available by appointment, and the chapel and courtyard are available as a site for weddings and other events.

See also
 List of Spanish missions in California
 San Timoteo Canyon
 Guachama Rancheria

Notes

References

External links
San Bernardino County Museum: San Bernardino de Sena Estancia

San Bernardino de Sena
1819 in Alta California
History museums in California
Museums in San Bernardino County, California
Buildings and structures in Redlands, California
California Historical Landmarks
History of San Diego County, California
History of San Bernardino County, California
History of Los Angeles County, California
1819 establishments in Alta California
Works Progress Administration in California